Garnock Valley is an area in the northern part of North Ayrshire, Scotland, adjoining Renfrewshire.

The region includes the towns of Beith, Dalry, and Kilbirnie, and some smaller villages such as Gateside, Barrmill, Longbar and Glengarnock; with a combined population of around 20,000.

See also

 River Garnock

References

External links
YouTube video of Dalgarven Mill and the River Garnock

Geography of North Ayrshire
Garnock Valley